A tunnel is an underground passage such as:

Tunnel or Tunnels may also refer to:

Film and TV
The Tunnel (1915 film), German silent, based on science fiction novel Der Tunnel by Bernhard Kellermann
The Tunnel (1933 German-language film), German-French co-production based on Kellermann's novel
The Tunnel (1933 French-language film), French-German co-production of above
The Tunnel (1935 film), British version of Kellermann's novel
"The Tunnel" (Playhouse 90), 1959 episode of American TV series, depicts Civil War tunnel
The Tunnel (1962 film), television documentary about construction of escape tunnel from East to West Berlin
The Tunnel (2001 film), German docudrama dramatizing events in 1962 documentary
The Tunnel (2009 film), South African short by Jenna Bass
The Tunnel (2011 film), Australian horror styled as found-footage documentary
The Tunnel (TV series), 2013 French-British bilingual crime drama based on 2011 Danish-Swedish series Broen (The Bridge)
Tunnel (2014 film), Nigerian drama about young pastor's life and struggles
The Tunnel (2014 film), South Korean horror recorded with 3D technology
Tunnelen, 2016 Norwegian horror / science fiction short film released in English as The Tunnel
Tunnel (2016 film), South Korean survival drama
Tunnel (TV series), 2017 South Korean crime / science fiction about police detective in time tunnel
The Tunnel (2019 film), Norwegian disaster thriller about tunnel fire

Geography
Tunnel, former name of Grosmont, North Yorkshire
Tunnel, Tasmania, locality in Australia
Tunnel City, Wisconsin, United States
Tunnel Creek, creek in Tunnel Creek National Park, Kimberley, Australia
Tunnel Mountain, mountain in Bow River Valley of Banff National Park in Alberta, Canada

Literature
Der Tunnel (novel), 1913 German futuristic tale by Bernhard Kellermann
El Túnel (The Tunnel), 1948 Argentine psychological novel by Ernesto Sabato
"The Tunnel" (short story), 1952 Swiss surrealistic train tale by Friedrich Dürrenmatt
"The Tunnel", naturalistic short story by Ruskin Bond from 1980 collection The Road to the Bazaar
The Tunnel (novel), 1995 psychological case study by William H. Gass
Tunnels (novel), 2007 subterranean fiction by Roderick Gordon and Brian Williams

Music
Labels
Tunnel Records, record label
Albums
Tunnel, 1999 album by Buckethead under his Death Cube K alias
Songs
"Tunnel" (The Screaming Jets song)
"Tunnel", song on the Wherever You Are (Third Day album)
"Neighborhood 1 (Tunnels)", song by Arcade Fire

Technology
Ground effect tunnels, another name for diffusers used on automobiles
Polytunnel, also known as high tunnel, type of greenhouse
Shrink tunnel (or heat tunnel), in packaging
Tunneling protocols in computing, e.g.:
 HTTP tunnel
ICMP tunnel
IP tunnel

Other uses
Nutmeg (football) or tunnel, football technique
THE Tunnel, or Trans Hudson Express Tunnel, American rail project in New Jersey
The Tunnel, popular New York City nightclub from 1986 to 2001
Tunnels (owarai), Japanese comedy duo

See also
Tunnel effect
Conduit (disambiguation)
Passage (disambiguation)
Subway (disambiguation)
Tunneling (disambiguation)
Tunel (disambiguation)
Tunnell, surname
Chunnel